Brachiomonas is a genus of thalloid biflagellate green algae. These algae generally are found in marine or brackish waters, but can tolerate wide range of salinities.  They may occur in freshwater pools near the sea and, occasionally, in polluted inland freshwater habitats.

Species 
The species currently recognised are 
B. simplex
B. submarina
B. westiana

References

External links

Chlamydomonadaceae
Chlamydomonadales genera